is a single by Japanese singer/songwriter Yōko Oginome. Written by Oginome, the single was released on August 5, 2020, by Victor Entertainment.

Background and release
"Mushi no Tsubuyaki" is a lighthearted depiction of the Earth's ecology through the point of view of various insects. Oginome has been taking up entomology since childhood, and she has been catching and observing grasshoppers and dragonflies with her children. When she learned that other parents and children have lost interest in insects, she wrote the song to educate children about the insect ecology. The song is also the first to feature Oginome on ukulele.

The music video is a simple animation by Haruka Suzuki, featuring the various insects depicted in the song.

The single was featured in the August 2020 edition of NHK's Minna no Uta, becoming Oginome's second contribution to the program after her 1988 song "Jungle Dance".

Track listing

References

External links

2020 singles
Yōko Oginome songs
Japanese-language songs
Japanese children's songs
Victor Entertainment singles
Minna no Uta